Galeojanolus is a genus of sea slugs, specifically nudibranchs, marine gastropod molluscs in the family Proctonotidae.

Species
The only species in the genus Galeojanolus determined to date is:
 Galeojanolus ioannae Miller, 1971

References

 Rudman, W.B., 1998 (August 10) Galeojanolus ioannae Miller, 1971. [In] Sea Slug Forum. Australian Museum, Sydney.

Proctonotidae